Biskupice-Kolonia  is a settlement in the administrative district of Gmina Grodziec, within Konin County, Greater Poland Voivodeship, in west-central Poland.

References

Biskupice-Kolonia